The New Portland Wire Bridge is a historic suspension bridge in New Portland, Maine. The bridge carries Wire Bridge Road across the Carrabassett River a short way north of the village center. Built in the mid-19th century, it is one of four 19th-century suspension bridges in the state. It is one lane wide, and has a weight limit of 3 tons. The bridge was listed on the National Register of Historic Places in 1970 and was designated as a Maine Historic Civil Engineering Landmark by the American Society of Civil Engineers in 1990.

Description and history
The bridge is in a rural setting, crossing the river just upstream of the mouth of Lemon Stream. The towers are covered in wooden shingles, and are constructed of  beams. The cable ends are anchored by concrete and granite blocks with an estimated weight of 30 tons. The decking surface is wooden planks.

The construction history of the bridge is a matter of minor local controversy. One traditional account places its construction at 1840-42, under the auspices of Colonel F. B. Morse, who lived nearby and had been an engineer in the army. According to this account, Morse ordered the cables from Sheffield, England, and had them hauled overland from Hallowell by a large team of oxen. Local criticism of the work led the bridge to dubbed "Morse's Fool Bridge". The official town history of the bridge is more prosaic, stating that it was built in 1864-66 by David Eider and Captain Charles Clark. The bridge was last rehabilitated in 2009-10; its towers and cable are original.

See also
List of bridges documented by the Historic American Engineering Record in Maine
List of bridges on the National Register of Historic Places in Maine
National Register of Historic Places listings in Somerset County, Maine

References

External links

Road bridges on the National Register of Historic Places in Maine
Transportation buildings and structures in Somerset County, Maine
Suspension bridges in Maine
Historic American Engineering Record in Maine
National Register of Historic Places in Somerset County, Maine
Steel bridges in the United States